The 1901 Cincinnati football team was an American football team that represented the University of Cincinnati as an independent during 1901 college football season. In its first season under head coach Henry S. Pratt, the team compiled a 1–4–1 record.

Schedule

References

Cincinnati
Cincinnati Bearcats football seasons
Cincinnati football